The 1935–36 season was Blackpool F.C.'s 35th season (32nd consecutive) in the Football League. They competed in the 22-team Division Two, then the second tier of English football, finishing tenth.

Joe Smith succeeded Sandy MacFarlane as manager prior to the start of the season.

Bobby Finan was the club's top scorer with 36 goals (34 in the league and two in the FA Cup).

Table

Notes

References

Blackpool F.C.
Blackpool F.C. seasons